Emmalocera syssema is a species of snout moth in the genus Emmalocera described by Alfred Jefferis Turner in 1913. It is found in Australia (Queensland, northern Australia and Western Australia).

References

Moths described in 1913
Emmalocera